Violeta Dinescu (born 13 July 1953, in Bucharest) is a Romanian composer, pianist and professor, living in Germany since 1982.

Romania 

Violeta Dinescu began her studies of music in 1972 at the conservatory Ciprian Porumbescu in Bucharest, composition with Myriam Marbe. In 1978 she received her master's degree, with distinction. She also received diplomas in the fields of Composition, Piano and Pedagogics. She started teaching at the George Enescu Music School in Bucharest, conducting courses in Music history, Aesthetics, Counterpoint, Harmony and Piano. In 1980 she joined the Romanian Composers Union.

Germany, operas 

In 1982 she moved to West Germany. Her first opera Hunger und Durst after Eugène Ionesco was premiered in Freiburg in 1986. Der 35. Mai (The 35th of May, or Conrad's Ride to the South Seas), a children's opera after Erich Kästner was composed in 1986, Eréndira after a short story by Gabriel García Márquez in 1992 and performed at the third Munich Biennale, Schachnovelle (The Royal Game) after Stefan Zweig in 1994. The operas have been performed at leading opera houses, as Der 35. Mai at the Staatsoper Hamburg in 2004. She worked for the Austrian theatre ARBOS on two music theatre projects, "The Singing of The Fools About Europe" and "The Concert of Birds".  Herzriss, an opera in nuce for voice and percussion after Homer, Ionesco and Márquez, premiered in 2005.

Teaching 

Since 1986 she has been teaching at German music academies in Heidelberg, Frankfurt, Bayreuth, and since 1996 as a professor of Applied Composition at the University of Oldenburg. There she started in 1996 to invite composers to a yearly Komponisten-Colloquium, in 2009 among others Jean-Luc Darbellay and Graham Waterhouse.

Violeta Dinescu has been an executive board member of the International Alliance of Women in Music' since 1987. Her works were published by Verlag Dohr and Schott Music, among others.

 Major works 

The prolific composer of orchestral music, chamber music, choral and vocal music received many international prizes and awards. Major commissioned works include Akrostichon and L‘ORA X for orchestra, an oratorio for Pentecost, Pfingstoratorium, music for the F. W. Murnau silent film Tabu and the ballets Der Kreisel and Effi Briest.

 Selected works 

 Akanua, piano, 1974
 Sonata, violin or viola, piano, 1975
 In meinem Garten, text by Ana Blandiana, children’s chorus, 1980
 Mondnächte, text by Joseph von Eichendorff, mezzo-soprano, saxophone, percussion, 1986
 Akrostichon, orchestra, 1983
 Der Kreisel, ballet, scenario after Eduard Mörike, orchestra, 1985
 Hunger und Durst, chamber opera, libretto by the composer after Ionesco, small orchestra (14 players), 1985
 Concerto, voice, orchestra, 1986
 Quatrain, text by François Villon, female voice, 1986
 Dona nobis pacem, mezzo-soprano, cello (+ percussion), 1987
 Tabu, film score for silent movie, small orchestra, 1988
 ICHTHYS, violin, cello, piano, 1991
 Der 35 Mai, children’s opera, libretto by the composer after Kästner, 3 soloists, 8 mixed voices, children’s chorus, orchestra, 1986
 Eréndira, chamber opera, libretto by the composer after Márquez, 7 soloists, small orchestra, 1992
 Pfingstoratorium, 5 soloists, mixed chorus, small orchestra, 1993
 Schachnovelle, chamber opera, libretto by the composer after Stefan Zweig, 3 soloists, chamber ensemble, 1994
 L'ORA X, orchestra, 1995
 Self-Reflections I/II, piano, live electronics, 1996–97
 Effi Briest, ballet, scenario after Theodor Fontane, orchestra, 1998
 Vortex – Wolken I, II und III, small orchestra, 1998
 Licht-Bruch, accordion, 2001
 Rugá, clarinet, double bass, accordion, 2001
 Herzriss, opera in nuce, female voice and percussion, 2005

References

External links 

 
 Violeta Dinescu at The Living Composers Project
 Verlag Dohr (in German) biographical sketch
 ARBOS Company for Music and Theatre
 Eva-Maria Houben: Violeta Dinescu Hochschule für Musik und Theater Hamburg (in German) 7 June 2008

20th-century classical composers
21st-century classical composers
Romanian classical pianists
Romanian women pianists
Romanian classical composers
Romanian opera composers
Ballet composers
Women classical composers
German women academics
Academic staff of the University of Oldenburg
Musicians from Bucharest
1953 births
Living people
Romanian emigrants to Germany
Women opera composers
21st-century classical pianists
Women classical pianists
20th-century women composers
21st-century women composers
20th-century women pianists
21st-century women pianists